The Silcis (sometimes spelled "Sil'is" or "Seles" in historical texts) are a Somali subclan. They are part of the Gorgarte subclan of the Hawiye clan, which is one of the major clans of Somali people. The Silcis inhabit the traditional coastal region of Benadir in the southern part of Somalia. This region should not be confused with the much smaller present day Banaadir administrative region (gobol) which contains Somalia’s capital Mogadishu. Silcis live, or have historically lived, along the Shabeelle River in towns such as Afgooye and Jowhaar, as well as along the coast, especially in Mogadishu and Warsheekh.

Emergence and early history of the Silcis Sultanate

The Silcis rose to prominence in the Shabeelle River region following the disintegration of the Ajuuraan Sultanate, which controlled a large part of southern Somalia, and with which the Silcis are connected. Cassanelli points out that in Geledi oral history accounts, the Silcis are often viewed as  "that section of the Ajuran who governed the Afgoy district". He asserts that Geledi accounts "attest to the continuity and similarity of Ajuran and Sil'is rule".

The Silcis centre of power was in Lama Jiidle (present day Afgooye). Lama Jiidle means "two roads" in Somali. Barile erroneously claims that Afgooye's previous name was simply "Seles" (the common Italian spelling of Silcis).

The Silcis imposed taxation on their subject clans, such as the Wacdaan, a fellow subclan of the Gurgate Hawiye, and the Geledi, a Rahanweyn subclan. According to Virginia Luling, "The Sil'is imposed their dominion on the Geledi, who had to pay as tribute a measure (suus) of grain every day from each household; it was collected and loaded on a camel, others say a donkey. A tax was also imposed on those who brought their stock to water at the river”. Barile also describes the taxes levied by the Silcis.

A controversial aspect of traditional Geledi and Wacdaan accounts of Silcis rule is the imposition by the Silcis sultan of ius primae noctis. According to Eno, "it was ‘Xeer’ [customary] for every Geledi bride... to celebrate her honeymoon [first] with a Silcis-Gorgaate male before she could celebrate the occasion with her official marital husband".

Luling, however, points out that ius primae noctis was "A habit regularly attributed to tyrants in this part of Somalia”. It is thus possible that the accounts of the Silcis practice were exaggerated by the clans they ruled. It is not known to what extent the Silcis sultans engaged in this practice. However, the importance of this account to Geledi and Wacdaan history should not be discounted or dismissed.

Overthrow of Silcis
The final ruler of the Silcis in Lama Jiidle (Afgooye) was the sultan 'Umur Abukar Abroone. According to Luling, "His daughter Imbia used to go round collecting the daily tribute of grain, accompanied by her slaves"  from her father's Wacdaan and Geledi subjects. Oral accounts hold that one day, "when the Sultan's daughter came round to collect the tribute, she got a beating instead of the grain", as the Geledi refused to pay. When Imbia reported this event to her father, he exclaimed "waa la i afgooye", literally "they have cut off my mouth", meaning that the regime's source of provision had been terminated. Lama Jiidle's name became Afgooye to commemorate this victory over the Silcis.

According to Cassanelli, “the Geledi (Rahanweyn) and Wa'dan (Darandolle Gurgate) allied to drive the Sil'is from Afgoy”.

The Silcis Sultanate in the Afgooye region was replaced by the Geledi Sultanate.

Later history
Some authors claim that the Silcis ceased to be a significant group after their overthrow in Afgooye. Puccioni states that "the Silcis were reduced to a small, sparse grouping along the Shabeelle from Afgooye to Bulo Mererta [“i Seles sono ridotti a piccoli raggruppamenti sparsi lungo lo Scebeli da Afgoi a Bulo Mererta”]. Luling claims that the Silcis "became an insignificant, scattered people”.

It is apparent, however, from the historical record beginning in the 19th century that the Silcis became established at Warsheekh and that this became their new centre. The Italian colonial administration signed a "TREATY of Peace, Friendship and Protection" with the "Chiefs of Warsheekh (Seles Gorgate and Abgal)" on August 26, 1894. The Italians also confirmed Haji Mao Mallim Elmi, a Silcis member, as the chief of Warsheekh in 1897.

In 1951, a large number of representatives of the Silcis submitted an appeal to the United Nations Advisory Council for the Trust Territory of Somaliland under Italian Administration, in order to protest the taking of Silcis lands by Italians. The signatories submitted the appeal “on behalf of the Seles Gorgate inhabitants living in Warsheikh, Giohar, Harar, Jigjiga, Mogadishu and Afgoi".

Notes

References
Barile, Pietro. Colonizzazione fascista nella Somalia meridionale. Roma: Societa Italiana Arti Grafiche, 1935.
Cassanelli, Lee Vincent. The Benaadir Past: Essays in Southern Somali History. PhD Thesis. University of Wisconsin, 1973.
Cassanelli, Lee Vincent. The Shaping of Somali Society: Reconstructing the History of a Pastoral People, 1600-1900. Philadelphia: Pennsylvania University Press, 1982.
Colucci, Massimo. Principi di Diritto Consuetudinario della Somalia Italiana meridionale. Firenze: Soc. An. Editrice "La Voce", 1924.
Eno, Mohamed A. The Homogeneity of the Somali People: A Study of the Somali Bantu Ethnic Community. PhD Thesis. St. Clement’s University, 2005.
Haji, Abdiwahid Osman. Somalia : A Chronology of Historical Documents 1827-2000. Gloucester, Ont: Abdiwahid Osman Haji, 2001.
Haji, Abdiwahid Osman and Aweis Osman Haji. Clan, sub-clan and regional representation in the Somali government organization, 1960-1990 : Statistical data and findings. Washington, D.C.: Abdiwahid Osman Haji, 2012.
Luling, Virginia. The Social Structure of Southern Somali Tribes. PhD Thesis. University of London, 1971.
Luling, Virginia. “The Use of the Past: Variations in Historical Tradition in a South Somali Community”. In Abdi, Mohamed Mohamed, ed. Anthropologie Somalienne: Actes du Ile Colloque des Études Somaliennes. (Besançon - 8/11 octobre 1990). Centre de Recherches d'Histoire Ancienne, Volume 123.
Puccioni, Nello. Le popolazioni indigene della Somalia Italiana. Bologna: Licinio Cappelli, 1937.

Hawiye clan